Chasing Nature is a reality television series on Animal Planet. On the show, teams of engineering students compete to create devices that simulate the abilities of animals.  Episodes include simulating bat sonar and a bird's claw. It premiered in December 2005. Self-driving car engineer Anthony Levandowski competed in an episode. The show, filmed in Australia, was described in The Boston Globe as "Survivor for really, really, smart people".

References 

Animal Planet original programming
American reality television series